This is a complete list of the operas of the Czech composer Josef Mysliveček (1737–1781). All of Mysliveček's operas are examples of opera seria (genre: dramma per musica) and in three acts.

List 

Note: There is no reason to believe that any of the following productions cited in earlier musicological literature ever took place: Medea (Parma, 1764); Erifile (Munich, 1773); Achille in Sciro (Naples, 1775); and Merope (Naples, 1775). Furthermore, there is no reason to believe that Mysliveček contributed any music to a production of Armida that took place in Lucca in 1778. The cantata Il Parnaso confuso is sometimes referred to in error as Mysliveček's first opera. Reports that it was performed in Parma in 1765 are conjectural; there is no documentation to verify its true date of composition or the venue of its first performance.

Recordings 
 Opera Medonte. L'Arte del Mondo. dir. Werner Ehrhardt, dhm, 2011
 Opera Il Bellerofonte. Prague Chamber Orchestra dir. Zoltán Peskó, Supraphon, 2003

References 
Notes
 
Sources
 Daniel E. Freeman, Josef Mysliveček, "Il Boemo": The Man and His Music, Detroit Monographs in Musicology, (Sterling Heights, Mich.: Harmonie Park Press, 2009), pp. 321–32. 

 
Lists of operas by composer
Lists of compositions by composer